The 2022 Giro dell'Emilia was the 105th edition of the Giro dell'Emilia road cycling one day race in the titular region of central Italy. It was held on 1 October 2022 as part of the 2022 UCI ProSeries.

Teams 
16 of the 19 UCI WorldTeams and six UCI ProTeams, and four UCI Continental teams made up the 25 teams that participated in the race.

UCI WorldTeams

 
 
 
 
 
 
 
 
 
 
 
 
 
 
 
 

UCI ProTeams

Result

References

Sources

External links 
  

Giro dell'Emilia
Giro dell'Emilia
Giro dell'Emilia
Giro dell'Emilia
Giro dell'Emilia